This is a list of all songs recorded by Queen.

Songs

Unreleased songs

Notes

References

External links

 Queen Concerts

Lists of songs recorded by British artists
 
British music-related lists